Mathew Ford (born 10 April 1994) is an Irish cricketer, and the son of Graham Ford, the former head coach of the Ireland cricket team. He made his List A debut on 20 May 2021, for Munster Reds in the 2021 Inter-Provincial Cup. He made his Twenty20 debut on 21 June 2019, for Leinster Lightning against Middlesex. Ford's brother, Greg, also plays cricket for Munster Reds.

Ford was the leading run-scorer in the 2021 Inter-Provincial Trophy, with 220 runs in eight matches.

References

External links
 

1994 births
Living people
Irish cricketers
Leinster Lightning cricketers
Munster Reds cricketers
Cricketers from Pietermaritzburg